Tsinghua Unigroup Co., Ltd. (“Group”) is a shareholding  group. Under Tsinghua Unigroup, there are over 200 subsidiaries running business respectively in diversified areas such as semiconductors, information and communication technologies, finance and insurance, education and real estate investment and development. Some of those subsidiary companies are publicly listed in China or HK stock market.

Overview
Tsinghua Unigroup has five main subsidiaries, New H3C Technologies, UNISOC Communications Co, Guoxin Micro, and UniCloud Technology Co. Other subsidiaries include Unisplendour Corp Ltd. and France-based Linxens, a design and manufacturing company of microconnectors for smart cards, RFID antennas and inlays. 

U.S. technology company Intel owns a 20 percent stake in Tsinghua Unigroup’s UNISOC subsidiary—a consolidation of Tsinghua Unigroup acquisitions of Spreadtrum Communications, a fabless semiconductor company, and semiconductor components manufacturer RDA Microelectronics. Tsinghua Unigroup operates a joint venture with Hewlett Packard Enterprise (HPE), as H3C Technologies Co, created after Tsinghua Unigroup purchased a 51 percent stake.

History

Origins
Tsinghua Unigroup was founded in 1988 by Tsinghua Holdings, a wholly-owned business unit of Tsinghua University, a major state research university in Beijing. The company was founded as Tsinghua University Sci-Tech General Company, then renamed Tsinghua Unigroup in 1993. Tsinghua Unigroup is a fabless semiconductor company that 100% owned by Beijing Zhiguangxin Holdings Limited ("Zhiguangxin"), has changed to no actual controller as there is no actual controller of Zhiguangxin on July 11, 2022. At the same time, the fifth session of the Board of Directors of Tsinghua Unigroup held its first meeting and elected Li Bin as the board chairman of Tsinghua Unigroup ; and appointed Li Bin to also serve as the general manager of Tsinghua Unigroup.

21st century
In 2013 and 2014, Tsinghua Unigroup acquired, first, Spreadtrum Communications, now UNISOC, a fabless semiconductor company that develops mobile chipset platforms, then RDA Microelectronics, a semiconductor component manufacturer. In 2014, Tsinghua Unigroup consolidated Spreadtrum and RDA to create UniSpreadtrum RDA, later UNISOC, in which Intel Corp. agreed to invest $1.5 billion for a 20 percent stake.

In May 2015, Tsinghua Unigroup acquired a 51 percent stake in Hewlett-Packard’s H3C Technologies, a China-based data-networking company, for approximately $2.3 billion. In September 2015, Western Digital announced that Unisplendour would make a US$3.775 billion equity investment to purchase its newly issued common stock, for about a 15 percent stake in the U.S. firm. Western Digital stated, in February 2016, that Unisplendour would not move forward with its offer following a decision by the Committee on Foreign Investment in the United States (CFIUS) to investigate the deal. In 2016, Tsinghua Unigroup partnered with Western Digital to establish a big data storage joint venture, Unis WDC Storage Co. in Nanjing

In 2016, Tsinghua Unigroup founded Yangtze Memory Technologies (YMTC), its IDM memory subsidiary. In 2017, Tsinghua Unigroup announced plans to build two new memory-chip factories, in Nanjing and Chengdu. Other investments include about a six percent stake in Portland, Oregon-based Lattice Semiconductor, acquired in 2017.

In June 2018, Tsinghua Unigroup acquired French smart chip components maker Linxens for a reported $2.6 billion. A restructuring proposal that would have Guoxin Micro acquire Unic Linxens (formerly Unigroup  Liansheng) was rejected by the China Securities Regulatory Commission (CSRC) in June 2020. In 2018, Tsinghua Unigroup also announced the construction of a $1.9 billion Linxens plant in the Tianjin Binhai Hi-Tech Industrial Development Area in Tianjin, China. The company broke ground in September 2019, and construction of a main factory building was completed in July 2020.

Financial issues 
On Dec 7th, 2020,Tsinghua Unigroup made an information disclosure that due to the liquidity constraint of Tsinghua Unigroup, as of the payment date (November 16, 2020), Tsinghua Unigroup was unable to raise the funds due for repayment. The debt financing Instrument called 17 Uni PPN005 could not be fully repaid as scheduled, which constituted a repudiatory breach.The cumulative amount of matured debt that Tsinghua Unigroup is obligated to settle is RMB1.3 billion.

It emerged on July 8, 2021, that one of the creditors of Tsinghua Unigroup - Huishang Bank - has applied to the Beijing No.1 Intermediate People's Court for bankruptcy reorganization. 

On July 16, 2021, Beijing No.1 Intermediate People's Court decided to accept the reorganization case of Tsinghua Unigroup,and on the same day appointed the liquidation team of Tsinghua Unigroup as the administrator , which is specifically responsible for carrying out reorganization work.

On January 17, 2022, the Beijing No. 1 Intermediate People’s Court ruled to approve the reorganization plan for the substantive consolidation of Tsinghua Unigroup and seven other enterprises and to terminate the reorganization proceedings of Tsinghua Unigroup and seven other enterprises. 

According to the reorganization plan approved by the ruling of the Beijing No.1 Intermediate People's Court, the consortium consisting of Wise Road Capital and Jac Capital as the leading party ("Zhilu Jianguang Consortium") is a strategic investor in the substantive merger and reorganization of seven enterprises, including Tsinghua UniGroup, Zhilu Jianguang Joint Venture plans to undertake 100% of the equity of Tsinghua UniGroup after restructuring through its war investment acquisition platform Beijing Zhiguangxin Holding. ("Zhiguangxin").

On July 11, 2022, Tsinghua UniGroup has completed the registration procedures and 100% of the equity interest of Tsinghua UniGroup has been registered under Zhiguangxin.

As of July 12th, 2022, the execution of the reorganization plan of Tsinghua UniGroup was completed.

In late 2021, two prominent funds -- Beijing Jianguang Asset Management Co. and Wise Road Capital -- appeared as new backers of Tsinghua Unigroup. On Jan. 17, a local court in Beijing gave the go-ahead to the consortium's restructuring plan for the company, thereby ending the reorganization proceedings.

In 2022, Beijing Zhiguangxin Holding took ownership of Tsinghua Unigroup. Beijing Zhiguangxin Holding's largest shareholder is Anhui state-owned fund Wuhu Xinhou Yunzhi Equity Investment Partnership.

Subsidiaries
In the field of technology, Tsinghua Unigroup invests mainly in Integrated Circuit design and information and communication infrastructure. Tsinghua Unigroup is the controlling shareholder of dozens of technology enterprises such as Unis, UNISOC, Guoxin Micro, Linxens, etc.

Guoxin Micro
Unigroup Guoxin Microelectronics Co.,Ltd.  (002049.SZ) ，provides IC chips for various applications such as mobilephone SIM card, finance IC card and POS machine, automotive MCU and smart connectivity IC for industry and IoT applications. In 2021, Guoxin Micro’s revenue reached CNY 5.34 billion.

Unicloud
Unicloud Technology Co., Ltd. is an industrial intelligent manufacturer that develops urban and industry cloud platforms for the construction and operation of smart cities in China.

UNISOC
UNISOC is an IC design platform company. The company's products include mobilephone central processors, baseband chips, AI chips, low power RF chips, and other IC chips for telecommunication, computing processor and controllers. Those products are used in consumer electronics and Internet of Things. In 2021, it gained an operating revenue of 11.7 billion yuan.

Linxens
Linxens is a smart chips components maker specializing in security and identification, such as flexible connectors used in smart cards and RFID antennas and inlays. In 2018, Tsinghua Unigroup, through its subsidiary Unigroup Liansheng, acquired Linxens for about $2.6 billion. Founded in 1979, Linxens is headquartered in Levallois-Perret, France and, as of 2018, employs over 3,200 staff at nine production sites worldwide. It also has offices in China, Singapore and Thailand, and operates six R&D centers. In June 2019, Guoxin Micro announced a plan to acquire Unigroup Liansheng, including its main asset, Linxens; the deal was rejected by the Chinese securities regulator the following year.

Unisplendour (UNIS)
Unisplendour Corporation Limited (000938.SZ) is a provider of full-stack ICT infrastructure. It provides services for digitization, networking, computing, cloud computing, and smart terminals.  Its subsidiary companies include H3C Technologies Co., Limited.Unisplendour Digital (Suzhou) Group Co., Ltd. and Unicompute Technology Co., Ltd., etc.

References

Manufacturing companies based in Beijing
Semiconductor companies of China
Foundry semiconductor companies
Government-owned companies of China